Misak may refer to:
 Misak people or Guambiano, an indigenous people of Colombia
 Misak language or Guambiano, a language of Colombia
Misak, an Armenian given name; notable people with the name include:
 Misak Metsarents (1886–1908), Western Armenian neo-romantic poet
 Missak Manouchian (1906–1944), French-Armenian poet and communist activist
 Misak Terzibasiyan (born 1964), Dutch architect
 Anahit Misak "Ana" Kasparian (born 1986), Armenian-American media host and journalist
 Mišak, a surname (including a list of people with the name)

See also
 
 Misaki (disambiguation)

Language and nationality disambiguation pages